Peter McCardle (born 28 September 1955), is a New Zealand politician. He was a Member of Parliament from 1990 to 1999, first as a member of the National Party, then as a member of New Zealand First, and finally as an independent. McCardle was deputy mayor of Upper Hutt from 2007 to 2013.

Pre-parliamentary career
McCardle originally worked for the New Zealand Employment Service, and was prompted to enter politics by a desire to make a significant contribution to unemployment and welfare policy.

Member of Parliament

McCardle was first elected to Parliament in the 1990 election as the National MP for the Heretaunga electorate, defeating the Labour MP Bill Jeffries. McCardle was re-elected in the 1993 election, defeating Labour Party candidate Heather Simpson.

McCardle, however, found his party colleagues unwilling to adopt his radical employment policies, which were primarily based around the idea of "workfare". In 1996, after being involved in failed discussions with Mike Moore to form a new party, McCardle eventually decided to leave National and join New Zealand First, where he hoped to have greater influence. He duly became New Zealand First's spokesperson for Employment.

McCardle was re-elected to Parliament as a New Zealand First list MP in the 1996 election, also unsuccessfully contesting the Rimutaka seat. In the coalition government formed by National and New Zealand First, McCardle became Minister of Employment, and set about implementing some of his proposals. When the coalition began to collapse, McCardle joined the group that broke from New Zealand First to continue supporting the government. He did not retain his Employment portfolio, but was given other ministerial roles including Minister of Consumer Affairs and Associate Minister of Social Services, Work and Income (with responsibility for Work and Income). He remained an independent for the duration of the parliamentary term, but did not choose to seek re-election in 1999.

Post-parliamentary career

Soon after the 1999 election the ACT MP Muriel Newman, who was her party's welfare spokesperson, hired McCardle as a consultant. McCardle eventually was offered the role as head of the ACT Parliamentary Research Unit. He left this role in 2005 to write his memoirs.

In the 2001 local body elections and district health board elections McCardle was elected as an Upper Hutt City councillor and Hutt Valley District Health Board member. He successfully defended both roles in the 2004 and 2007 elections. After the 2007 elections he was additionally appointed deputy mayor of Upper Hutt, a position he maintained until 2013.

McCardle resigned from the Hutt Valley District Health Board in 2008, when he was hired as a senior advisor to the new National Party Minister of Health, Tony Ryall. McCardle and Ryall entered Parliament together in 1990. After Ryall's retirement in 2014, McCardle continued working under the successive Health Minister, Jonathan Coleman.

McCardle was elected to his fourth and final term on the Upper Hutt City Council in 2010. He stood down from the council at the 2013 election to campaign against local-body amalgamation in the Wellington region.

References 

1955 births
Living people
Deputy mayors of places in New Zealand
People from Upper Hutt
New Zealand First MPs
New Zealand National Party MPs
New Zealand city councillors
Independent MPs of New Zealand
New Zealand list MPs
New Zealand MPs for Hutt Valley electorates
Members of the New Zealand House of Representatives
New Zealand public servants
Hutt Valley District Health Board members